Santiago Hernán González Bonorino (born May 5, 1975 in Buenos Aires) is a former Argentine rugby union player, most recently playing for Northampton Saints in the Guinness Premiership

He has represented Unione Rugby Capitolina in Italy at club level, and Argentina's national side. González Bonorino plays as a prop.

González Bonorino made his debut for the national side on May 19, 2001, in a match against , and has received 15 caps in total (as of May 2009).

In 2008, he signed a contract with English Guinness Premiership giants Leicester Tigers, but after playing only 6 games for them he joined Leicester's rivals, Northampton Saints on a one-year deal for the start of the 2009 season. Injury cut short his season and he was forced to retire in January 2010.

References

External links
UAR profile
Tigers profile
Santiago González Bonorino

1975 births
Living people
Rugby union players from Buenos Aires
Argentine rugby union players
Rugby union props
San Isidro Club rugby union players
Leicester Tigers players
Argentina international rugby union players
Argentine expatriate rugby union players
Expatriate rugby union players in France
Expatriate rugby union players in England
Expatriate rugby union players in Italy
Argentine expatriate sportspeople in Italy
Argentine expatriate sportspeople in France
Argentine expatriate sportspeople in England
Northampton Saints players
AS Béziers Hérault players
Castres Olympique players